Oswaldo Zea (born 25 April 1963) is a Venezuelan hurdler. He competed in the men's 400 metres hurdles at the 1984 Summer Olympics.

References

External links
 

1963 births
Living people
Athletes (track and field) at the 1984 Summer Olympics
Venezuelan male hurdlers
Olympic athletes of Venezuela
Athletes (track and field) at the 1983 Pan American Games
Pan American Games competitors for Venezuela
Place of birth missing (living people)
20th-century Venezuelan people
21st-century Venezuelan people